Jōtō Station is the name of two train stations in Japan:

 Jōtō Station (Okayama) (上道駅)
 Jōtō Station (Gunma) (城東駅)